Adame Ba Konaré (born 1 May 1947 in Segu, Mali) is a Malian historian  and writer who is married to Alpha Oumar Konaré, former President of Mali. She is active in several causes for newborns and refugees.

Life
Adame Ba Konaré was born in Ségou on 1 May 1947 to Marmadou Ba who was a dentist and his wife Kadiatou Thiam. Her parents hailed from a Fula family. She attended the highest education facility, the École Normale Supérieure in Bamako, along with her future husband, Alpha Oumar Konaré. They married on 15 September 1971. Her new husband was employed as a high school teacher but he was to be sent to the University of Warsaw to undertake doctoral research. They both obtained a PhD in History in 1976. She returned to Mali and became a history professor at her alma mater in Bamako.

Konaré and her husband worked together on several projects. They published a book together in 1983 called Grande Dates Du Mali and they both worked for the democratic cause under the presidency of Moussa Traore who ruled Mali's single party state until 1991. During that time they created a publishing house Jamana and a daily newspaper Les Echos and a political party called ADEMA-PAS. In 1991 president Moussa Traoré was deposed and in the following elections her husband was elected as the first democratically elected president since Mali's independence.

Konaré has written various types of books, from biographies (about Sunni Ali Ber) to philosophy (L'Os de la parole) and even a novel (Quand l'ail se frotte a l'encens), the plot of which focuses on the social gap in a fictional society similar to Mali's. For this book, her style has been compared to French authors Emile Zola and Victor Hugo's works.

Although officially retired, she is often invited to conferences on African History. In addition to her work in academia, Adam Ba Konare is also an outspoken feminist, and the founder of one of the few women's museums in Africa. The museum was started in 1987 following the publication of Konaré's book The Dictionary of Famous Women of Mali. The museum, Muso Kunda, is funded by Konaré.

More recently, she has been involved in a project to promote African History, following French president Nicolas Sarkozy's speech in Dakar. The movement aims to write a history of Africa, defending the African legacy and past civilizations. As an historian, Adam Ba Konare disagreed with Sarkozy's speech and invited African historians, intellectuals and all friends of Africa to join to write a rebuttal to Sarkozy's speech in order to denounce "the attacks on African memory".

She is the mother of Kadiatou Konaré, a Malian minister of culture.

References

External links
 African Union article
 Refugee Education trust
 Site of the Women's Museum (Muso Kunda)
 Adame Ba Konaré, University of Western Australia

1947 births
Living people
First ladies of Mali
Malian historians
Malian women novelists
Grand Officers of the National Order of Mali
Fula people
People from Ségou
Women historians
20th-century historians
20th-century women writers
21st-century historians
21st-century women writers
21st-century Malian people